Colin Emerson Bennett (March 5, 1908 – April 30, 1993) was a Canadian politician and lawyer. He was elected to the House of Commons of Canada in the 1949 election to represent the riding of Grey North. He was re-elected in 1953. During his second term, he was Parliamentary Assistant to the Minister of Veterans Affairs.

Born in Meaford, Ontario, Bennett was a member of the Royal Canadian Air Force as group captain between 1941 and 1945.

External links
 

1908 births
1993 deaths
Liberal Party of Canada MPs
Members of the House of Commons of Canada from Ontario